A  is a type of Japanese cap generally consisting of lacquer-coated black silk gauze, with ornaments including a pennon. It was the standard headwear worn by adult men at the Japanese imperial court, including courtiers, aristocrats, and the emperor, from the Heian period to the Meiji Restoration. Today, it is worn only by the Imperial Family and government officials on rare occasions, such as weddings and the accession of new emperors.

The type of kanmuri generally differs from the shape of pennon and its textile pattern, and depends on a person's rank. A version with upright pennon decorated with the imperial chrysanthemum crest is worn only by emperor, a civilian official worn a version with folded pennon, a military officer worn a version with curved pennon, others may have just circular frames.

References

External links

Court uniforms and dress
Japanese headgear
Japanese words and phrases